Breaking All the Rules may refer to:

Film and TV
Breaking All the Rules (film), a 1985 film directed by James Orr
Breakin' All the Rules, a 2004 film
Breaking all the Rules: The Creation of Trivial Pursuit, a 1988 film about the creation of the game Trivial Pursuit

Music
Breaking All the Rules (Peter Frampton album), 1981, or the title song
Breaking All the Rules (She Moves album)
"Breaking All the Rules" (She Moves song), 1997
"Breaking All the Rules," a song from the Ozzy Osbourne album No Rest for the Wicked
Breaking All the Rules (3 of Hearts album), 2005